Chen-Tong Fei-Ming (born 23 October 1968), born Tong Fei-Ming, is a Chinese-born table tennis player who represented Chinese Taipei at the 2000 Summer Olympics.

References

External links

1968 births
Living people
Chinese female table tennis players
Taiwanese female table tennis players
Olympic table tennis players of Taiwan
Table tennis players at the 2000 Summer Olympics
Taiwanese people from Zhejiang
Table tennis players from Zhejiang
Sportspeople from Wenzhou
Naturalised table tennis players